Heriaeus is a genus of crab spiders that was first described by Eugène Louis Simon in 1875.

Species
 it contains thirty-seven species, found in Europe, Asia, and Africa:
Heriaeus algericus Loerbroks, 1983 – Algeria
Heriaeus allenjonesi van Niekerk & Dippenaar-Schoeman, 2013 – South Africa
Heriaeus antoni van Niekerk & Dippenaar-Schoeman, 2013 – Senegal, Yemen
Heriaeus buffoni (Audouin, 1826) – North Africa, Israel
Heriaeus buffonopsis Loerbroks, 1983 – Central Asia
Heriaeus capillatus Utochkin, 1985 – Kazakhstan
Heriaeus chareshi (Sen & Sureshan, 2022) – India
Heriaeus charitonovi Utochkin, 1985 – Central Asia
Heriaeus concavus Tang & Li, 2010 – China
Heriaeus convexus Tang & Li, 2010 – China
Heriaeus copricola van Niekerk & Dippenaar-Schoeman, 2013 – South Africa
Heriaeus crassispinus Lawrence, 1942 – Central, East, Southern Africa
Heriaeus delticus Utochkin, 1985 – Russia (Europe)
Heriaeus fedotovi Charitonov, 1946 – Central Asia
Heriaeus foordi van Niekerk & Dippenaar-Schoeman, 2013 – South Africa
Heriaeus graminicola (Doleschall, 1852) – Europe, Caucasus, Iran
Heriaeus hirtus (Latreille, 1819) (type) – Europe, Turkey, Caucasus
Heriaeus horridus Tyschchenko, 1965 – Russia (Europe to West Siberia), Central Asia
Heriaeus latifrons Lessert, 1919 – Tanzania
Heriaeus madagascar van Niekerk & Dippenaar-Schoeman, 2013 – Madagascar
Heriaeus maurusius Loerbroks, 1983 – Morocco
Heriaeus mellotteei Simon, 1886 – China, Korea, Japan
Heriaeus muizenberg van Niekerk & Dippenaar-Schoeman, 2013 – South Africa
Heriaeus numidicus Loerbroks, 1983 – Morocco, Algeria
Heriaeus oblongus Simon, 1918 – Europe, Caucasus, Russia (Europe) to Central Asia
Heriaeus orientalis Simon, 1918 – Greece, Turkey, Ukraine
Heriaeus peterwebbi van Niekerk & Dippenaar-Schoeman, 2013 – Namibia, South Africa
Heriaeus pilosus Nosek, 1905 – Turkey
Heriaeus setiger (O. Pickard-Cambridge, 1872) – South-eastern Europe, Turkey, Middle East, Caucasus
Heriaeus simoni Kulczyński, 1903 – Southwest Europe, Greece, Turkey
Heriaeus sossusvlei van Niekerk & Dippenaar-Schoeman, 2013 – Namibia, South Africa
Heriaeus spinipalpus Loerbroks, 1983 – Eastern Mediterranean, Caucasus, Iran, Turkmenistan
Heriaeus transvaalicus Simon, 1895 – South Africa
Heriaeus xanderi van Niekerk & Dippenaar-Schoeman, 2013 – Tanzania, South Africa
Heriaeus xinjiangensis Liang, Zhu & Wang, 1991 – China
Heriaeus zanii van Niekerk & Dippenaar-Schoeman, 2013 – South Africa
Heriaeus zhalosni Komnenov, 2017 – North Macedonia, Greece

In synonymy:
H. claveatus (Walckenaer, 1837) = Heriaeus hirtus (Latreille, 1819)
H. fimbriatus Lawrence, 1942 = Heriaeus crassispinus Lawrence, 1942
H. kumaonensis (Tikader, 1980) = Heriaeus horridus Tyschchenko, 1965
H. propinquus Kulczyński, 1903 = Heriaeus simoni Kulczyński, 1903
H. sareptanus Loerbroks, 1983 = Heriaeus horridus Tyschchenko, 1965

Nomina dubia
H. difficilis Strand, 1906
H. melanotrichus Simon, 1903

See also
 List of Thomisidae species

References

Further reading

Araneomorphae genera
Spiders of Africa
Spiders of Asia
Thomisidae